Daniel Isaachsen may refer to:

 Daniel Isaachsen (physicist) (1859–1940), Norwegian physicist
 Daniel Otto Isaachsen (1806–1891), Norwegian businessman and politician